Eight Hours Don't Make a Day   (also translated as  (Eight Hours Are Not a Day) is a West German television miniseries written and directed by Rainer Werner Fassbinder. Commissioned by Westdeutscher Rundfunk, it was broadcast in five episodes between 1972 and 1973. The story follows a group of working-class people in Cologne, West Germany.

Episodes

Cast

All episodes
 Gottfried John as Jochen Epp
 Hanna Schygulla as Marion Andreas
 Luise Ulrich as Oma Krüger
 Werner Finck as Gregor Mack
 Irm Hermann as Irmgard Erlkönig
 Wolfgang Schenck as Franz Miltenberger
 Wolfgang Zerlett as Manfred Müller
 Rudolf Waldemar Brem as Rolf Schwein
 Grigorios Karipidis as Giuseppe Giuliano
 Wolfried Lier as Wolf Epp
 Hans Hirschmüller as Jürgen Graf
 Renate Roland as Monika
 Anita Bucher as Käthe Epp
 Karl Scheydt as Arbeiter Peter
 Rainer Hauer as Werkshallenleiter Volkmar Gross
 Andrea Schober as Sylvia
 Herb Andress as Rüdiger
 Thorsten Massinger as Manni Andreas

 Kurt Raab as Harald (4 episodes)
 El Hedi ben Salem (uncredited) as Dunkelhäutiger Arbeiter (4 episodes)
 Ruth Drexel as Frau Miltenberger (3 episodes)
 Christine Oesterlein as Tante Klara (2 episodes)
 Brigitte Mira as Marions Mutter, Frau Andreas (1 episode)
 Peter Gauhe as Ernst Friedrich (1 episode)
 Victor Curland as Meister Fritz Kretzschmer (1 episode)
 Klaus Löwitsch as Dr. Betram (1 episode)
 Rudolf Lenz as Vermieter Mattes (1 episode)
 Hans Gromball as Betrüger (1 episode)
 Valeska Gert as Die andere Oma (1 episode)
 Margit Carstensen as Hausfrau (1 episode)
 Ulli Lommel as Peter (1 episode)
 Eva Mattes as Beschwippste Freundin (1 episode)
 Lilo Pempeit as Hausfrau Müller (1 episode)
 Heinz Meier as Beamter Meier (1 episode)
 Ursula Strätz (uncredited) as Peters Frau (1 episode)
 Peter Chatel as Mann in der Anzeigenannahme (1 episode)

Restoration
In December 2016, it was announced that the restored version would have its world premiere in the Berlinale Special section of the 67th Berlin International Film Festival. In September 2017, Arrow Films released this version in a limited edition dual-format DVD and Blu-ray box set in the UK. The UK release runs at the original speed of 25 frames per second. In October 2018, The Criterion Collection released it on DVD and Blu-ray in the USA, slowed to 24 frames per second.

References

External links
 
Eight Hours Don’t Make a Day: The Utopia Channel an essay by Moira Weigel at the Criterion Collection

1972 German television series debuts
1973 German television series endings
Television shows set in North Rhine-Westphalia
German-language television shows
Das Erste original programming
Grimme-Preis for fiction winners
Rainer Werner Fassbinder
Films scored by Fuzzy (composer)